Gerard Vianen (9 February 1944 – 10 December 2014) was a Dutch professional road bicycle racer. A domestique for Joop Zoetemelk and Raymond Poulidor, he won one stage in the Tour de France and 3 stages in the Vuelta a España.

Vianen died from leukemia on 10 December 2014 at the age of 70.

Major results

1965
GP Faber
1966
Ronde van Overijssel
1967
Eeklo
Kampioenschap van Vlaanderen
Ninove
1968
Neerbeek
Yerseke
1970
Kamerik
1971
Vuelta a España:
Winner stage 10
Genoa–Nice
Schinnen
1972
Vuelta a España:
Winner stages 2 and 15
Rijen
1974
Tour de France:
Winner stage 20
1975
Obbicht
Ronde van Midden-Zeeland
Linne
1977
Kamerik
Galder

References

External links 

Official Tour de France results for Gerard Vianen

1944 births
2014 deaths
People from Breukelen
Dutch male cyclists
Dutch Tour de France stage winners
Dutch Vuelta a España stage winners
Tour de Suisse stage winners
Deaths from leukemia
Cyclists from Utrecht (province)